Velkovrhia is a genus of cnidarians belonging to the family Bougainvilliidae.

The species of this genus are found in Europe.

Species:

Velkovrhia enigmatica

References

Bougainvilliidae
Hydrozoan genera